Alexander Kibrik (Russian: Александр Евгеньевич Кибрик; March 26, 1939 – 31 October, 2012) was a Russian linguist, doctor of philology and the head of the department of theoretical and applied linguistics of the Philological Faculty of Moscow State University.

Life
Kibrik was born in Leningrad, the son of the painter Yevgeny Kibrik. He became the head of the department of theoretical and applied linguistics of the Philological Faculty of the Moscow State University in 1992. He worked in the fields of linguistic typology, Northeast Caucasian languages and theoretical linguistics.  Kibrik was especially well known for his longtime fieldwork and field teaching, as well as grammar-editing, on the languages of the Caucasus including the Archi, the Khinalug, the Godoberi, the Tsakhur, the Bagvalal, the Russian and Alutor languages.

Death
Kibrik died in Moscow at the age of 73 and was buried at Novodevichy cemetery, near his father.  His wife was Russian linguist Antonina Koval. He had two children: the linguist Andrej Kibrik and the painter Nina Kibrik.

References

External links
 Kibrik's profile at the Russian Academy of Sciences website 
 Kibrik's profile at the British Academy website
 Kibrik's personal page and  Memorial page at the OTiPL website 
 A. E. Kibrik: Obituary at the LINGUIST List by Barbara Hall Partee
 Aleksandr Kibrik. How I became a Linguist (Linguist of the Day at the LINGUIST List)
 Kibrik Family website 

Linguists from Russia
Linguists from the Soviet Union
Russian people of Jewish descent
20th-century linguists
Syntacticians
Moscow State University alumni
Academic staff of Moscow State University
Writers from Saint Petersburg
1939 births
2012 deaths
Corresponding Members of the Russian Academy of Sciences
Corresponding Fellows of the British Academy
Burials at Novodevichy Cemetery
Caucasologists